Micki Grant (born Minnie Louise Perkins, June 30, 1929 – August 22, 2021) was an American singer (soprano), actress, writer, and composer. She performed in Having Our Say (as Sadie Delaney), Tambourines to Glory and Jericho-Jim Crow both co-written by Langston Hughes, The Gingham Dog, Don't Bother Me, I Can't Cope, and  received three Tony Award nominations for her writing.

Early life 
Minnie Louise Perkins was born in Chicago, Illinois, to Gussie and Oscar Perkins on June 30, 1929. Some sources also state that she was born in 1941; Grant was said to have lowered her age early for reasons related to her career. Her father was a self-taught pianist and master barber, and her mother worked for Stanley Products. She began studying music with double-bass lessons at her elementary school. Grant first took piano lessons at the age of eight, and the next year took acting lessons with Susan Porché. After high school, her cousin, film actress Jeni Le Gon took her under her wing when Grant moved to Los Angeles. Following graduation from Englewood High School in Chicago, Grant studied at the Chicago School of Music and attended the University of Illinois, which she left after three years to move to New York City. Years later she went back to school and graduated from Lehman College in 1994 with a degree in English and Theatre, summa cum laude. In 2015, Lehman College awarded her the degree of Doctor of Fine Arts, honoris causa.

Career

Theater 
While in Los Angeles, she was cast in Fly Blackbird by James V. Hatch and C. Bernard Jackson. The show was successful and it moved to New York City. She graduated summa cum laude from Lehman College. In the early 1960s, she appeared off-Broadway in Jean Genet's The Blacks (with James Earl Jones and Cicely Tyson), and in Brecht on Brecht, in which she sang "Pirate Jenny". In 1964, Grant appeared as Ella Hammer in Howard da Silva's off-Broadway revival of Marc Blitzstein's The Cradle Will Rock, opposite Jerry Orbach and Rita Gardner.

Much of her early work was done with director Vinnette Carroll, the first African-American woman to direct on Broadway. They collaborated on Don't Bother Me, I Can't Cope, in which Grant starred and for which she wrote the music, book and lyrics, and Your Arms Too Short to Box with God, for which Grant wrote additional lyrics and music. Both enjoyed critical acclaim and long Broadway runs. She was a member of Delta Sigma Theta sorority.

Television 

In the first story line written for an African-American in a daytime soap opera, Grant portrayed attorney Peggy Nolan on Another World (1966–1973). She later appeared on The Edge of Night replacing Billie Allen as Ada Chandler  and was in the cast of Guiding Light (1982–1984). She also had a brief stint as host of Around the Corner, a children's show on CBS.

Radio 
In her early days in New York City, Grant sought to supplement her income by working as a receptionist at a radio station. A meeting with a top executive at the station diverted her attention to working on the air. Readings and Writings featured Grant performing material that she compiled from research at a public library.

Personal life and death 
Grant married television news film editor Ray McCutcheon in 1966. They were married for 12 years before divorcing in 1978. Grant died on August 22, 2021, at the age of 92 in Manhattan, New York City.

Recognition 
Grant received a 1972 Obie Award for Music and Lyrics for her work on Don't Bother Me, I Can't Cope.

Writing credits 
 "Pink Shoe Laces" (1959), pop song, recorded by Dodie Stevens, reached number 3 on the U.S single charts. A Spanish-language version was number 1 in Mexico for 9 weeks.
 Don't Bother Me, I Can't Cope (1971), musical – music and lyrics, performer
 Croesus and the Witch (1971), musical – music and lyrics
 Step Lively, Boy (1973), musical – music and lyrics
 The Prodigal Sister (1974), musical – music and lyrics
 Your Arms Too Short to Box with God (1976), musical – additional music and lyrics
 The Ups and Downs of Theophilis Maitland (1976), musical – music and lyrics
 I'm Laughing but I Ain't Tickled (1976), musical – music and lyrics
 Alice (1978), musical – music and lyrics
 Working (1978), musical – music and lyrics with Stephen Schwartz, Craig Carnelia, James Taylor, Mary Rodgers and Susan Birkenhead
 Eubie! (1978), musical revue – additional lyrics
 It's So Nice to Be Civilized (1980), musical – book, music and lyrics
 Phillis (1986), musical – music and lyrics
 Step into My World (1989), revue – music and lyrics
 Carver (Don't Underestimate a Nut) (1996) – music, lyrics, and book

References

External links 

Listing from The History Makers
Micki Grant Dies: Broadway's Trailblazing 'Don't Bother Me, I Can't Cope' Creator Also Pioneered Daytime TV For Black Performers

1929 births
2021 deaths
Actresses from Chicago
African-American composers
African-American women composers
American women composers
American musical theatre composers
American musical theatre lyricists
American soap opera actresses
American sopranos
Women musical theatre composers
Grammy Award winners
Lehman College alumni
Singers from Chicago
Songwriters from Illinois
African-American songwriters
20th-century African-American women singers
21st-century African-American people
21st-century African-American women